Bishop Cotton Boys' School is an all-boys school for boarders and day scholars in Bangalore, India, founded in the memory of Bishop George Edward Lynch Cotton, Bishop of Calcutta. The school has been described as "The Eton of the East".

School heads in the early days included George Uglow Pope, Herbert Pakenham-Walsh, S. T. Pettigrew, William Elphick, Iowerth Lowell Thomas and A. T. Balraj.

The Boarding has around 200 students from all over India and also International students from Thailand, Nepal etc.
The sister school Bishop Cotton Girls' School is located on the opposite side of St. Mark's Road.

Origins 
The school's past extends back to the British Raj and the Victorian era with its beginnings in a house on High Grounds over which now stands the great ITC Windsor Hotel. It was started in 1865 by Rev. S T Pettigrew, the then Chaplain of St. Mark's Cathedral who had a vision of starting a school for the education of children of European and Anglo-Indian families. In his own words, he wanted to "establish a day and boarding School for the Children of Christian residents in the station and its vicinity." The school was named in honour of George Cotton, Bishop of Calcutta, under whose stewardship a scheme of education was organized for the Anglican Churches in India. After India gained independence from the British in 1947, the school began to be, and is still governed by the Church of South India.

In the first five years of the school it had three principals. It was only with the arrival of George Uglow Pope, a distinguished Tamil scholar (who translated the famed Tirukkuṛaḷ into English) that the present site was acquired For Rs 47,500. The boys' school and the girls' school functioned on the same campus but under different heads. Under the stewardship of Pope, the school grew from strength to strength. A collegiate section was started and the school obtained recognition from the University of Madras. He gave the School its motto – 'Nec Dextrorsum Nec Sinistrorsum', meaning 'Neither to the right nor to the Left'.

When Pope left India in 1892 to take up the post of Reader at Oxford University, the standard of the school began to decline. By 1906, closure of the school was contemplated.

Henry Whitehead, Bishop of Madras, the chairman of the Board of Governors, as a last resort, invited the members of the Brotherhood of Saint Peter to save the school from closure. Herbert Pakenham-Walsh, of the Brotherhood of St. Peter, later to become Bishop, revived the school. The school still celebrates St. Peter's day amongst other traditions such as Guy Fawkes' bonfires. In 1911, the girls' school was moved across the road. William Elphick worked for a quarter of century for the growth of the school.

The last living member of the Brotherhood of St Peter in India, Father David, died of old age. He lived and worked in the school as the school chaplain.

General K.S. Thimayya Memorial Trust
The General K.S. Thimayya Memorial Trust pays tribute to the School, in memory of General K. S. Thimayya, Cottonian (1918 to 1922). The Trust organises the annual Thimayya Memorial Lecture, and awards the Thimayya Medal to Cottonians who have demonstrated exemplary public service. The Trust also operates a Benevolent Fund that supports former staff members of the School, monetarily.

Notable alumni

Science 
  Nasir Ahmed awarded the Pope Medal in 1954; Life Fellow of the IEEE for his "contributions to digital signal processing and education", 1985; best known for the development of the discrete cosine transform, a data compression .
 Prof. B.Jayant Baliga, Indian electrical engineer best known for his work in power semiconductor devices, and particularly the invention of the insulated gate bipolar transistor (IGBT).
 Prof. Ramesh Rajan, neuroscientist best known for his work in sensory neuroscience and traumatic brain injury.
 Mandyam Veerambudi Srinivasan, Australian bioengineer and neuroscientist who studies visual systems, particularly those of bees and birds.
 Dr Ajit Varki, Physician-scientist who is distinguished professor of medicine and cellular and molecular medicine, co-director of the Glycobiology Research and Training Center at the University of California, San Diego (UCSD)
 Varghese Mathai, mathematician at the University of Adelaide. His first most influential contribution is the Mathai–Quillen formalism
 Sudarshan Devanesan, Physician and educator, public health activist, and member of the Order of Canada
Ananth Dodabalapur, Indian-American engineer, currently the Motorola Regents Chair Professor in Electrical and Computer Engineering at the University of Texas at Austin
 Angus Finlay Hutton, British naturalist

Military 
 Lieutenant General A C Iyappa
 Lieutenant General Jameel Mahmood
 Major General Sultan Mahmood
 Col. Lalit Rai, VrC
 William Leefe Robinson, Victoria Cross awardee
 Admiral Vijay Singh Shekhawat, former Chief of Naval Staff, Indian Navy
 General Sir Frank Simpson, former Chief of Army Staff, Great Britain
 General K. S. Thimayya, former Chief of Army Staff, Indian Army
 Air Marshall Malcolm Wollen
 Vice Admiral Krishna Swaminathan, VSM

Positions of responsibility 
 Norman Majoribanks, former Governor of Madras
 Gopal Krishna Pillai, former Union Home Secretary, Government of India
 Dr. Raja Ramanna, Padma Vibhushan, scientist and former chairman, Atomic Energy Commission.  
Dinesh Gundu Rao, former minister of state for food, civil supplies and consumer affairs in the government of Karnataka

Entrepreneurs 
 Nandan Nilekani, Chairman of the Unique Identification Authority of India (UIDAI), co-founder of Infosys 
 Philip Wollen, ex-Vice President of Citibank; philanthropist and social justice advocate
 Rohan Murty,  Indian technical officer, junior fellow at the Harvard Society of Fellows, and the founder of the Murty Classical Library of India 
 Bharat Goenka, Co-founder and managing director of Tally Solutions
 Varun Agarwal, founder of Alma Mater

Arts 
 Lucky Ali, Bollywood singer
 Biddu Appaiah, British-Indian singer-songwriter, composer, and music producer
 Prabhu, Indian actor, businessman and film producer 
 Ricky Kej, composer, music producer
 Feroz Khan, actor
 Brodha V, Hip hop artist 
 Ashvin Mathew, Indian film and stage actor, stand-up comedian and screenwriter.

Sports 

 Brijesh Patel, Cricketer
 Colin Cowdrey, Cricketer
 Mayank Agarwal, Cricketer
 Eugeneson Lyngdoh, Footballer
 David Mathias, Cricketer
 Amit Verma, Cricketer 
 Nihar Ameen, Swimmer

Literature 

 Kenneth Anderson, writer
Makarand Paranjape , Indian novelist, poet, the Director at Indian Institute of Advanced Study (IIAS), Shimla

References

External links

Church of South India schools
Boys' schools in India

Bangalore Civil and Military Station
Boarding schools in Karnataka
Christian schools in Karnataka
High schools and secondary schools in Karnataka
Private schools in Bangalore
Educational institutions established in 1865
1865 establishments in India